The following is a list of the characters from the Degrassi Classic era of the Canadian teen drama Degrassi franchise, created by Linda Schuyler and Kit Hood in 1979.

Degrassi Junior High was the second series in the Degrassi franchise, and ran on CBC on from 18 January 1987 to 6 March 1989. The series centers around an ethnically and economically diverse group of adolescents attending the fictional Degrassi Junior High School in east end Toronto, as they deal with various issues including teenage pregnancy, abuse, and sexuality.

This was followed by Degrassi High, which ran on CBC from 6 November 1989 to 28 January 1991, following most of the same characters in high school as they deal with more controversial issues, such as abortion, AIDS, and death. The Degrassi Classic era concluded with the 1992 made-for-television film School's Out, which followed the students post-graduation.

The cast of the two series were drawn from a repertory company, and the focus on characters usually varied, with major characters sometimes being seen in the background, and minor characters or extras getting an elevated role. For example, Christine "Spike" Nelson, a major character in the series whose child, Emma, influenced the development of Degrassi: The Next Generation, began an extra with no speaking lines.

Students
In order of first credited appearance:

Primary characters

Secondary characters

Adults

References

Degrassi